West Fork is a city in Washington County, Arkansas, United States. The population is 2,317 at the 2010 census. It is part of the Northwest Arkansas region.

History
West Fork was incorporated as a city in 1885.

Geography

Demographics

As of the census of 2000, there were 2,042 people, 750 households, and 600 families residing in the city. The racial makeup of the city was 94.56% White or European American, 0.44% Black or African American, 0.93% Native American, 0.54% Asian, 1.71% from other races, and 1.81% from two or more races.  3.13% of the population were Hispanic or Latino of any race.

There were 750 households, out of which 41.2% had children under the age of 18 living with them, 63.3% were married couples living together, 12.1% had a female householder with no husband present, and 19.9% were non-families. 16.4% of all households were made up of individuals, and 7.6% had someone living alone who was 65 years of age or older.  The average household size was 3.72 and the average family size was 4.04.

In the city, the population was spread out, with 30.0% under the age of 18, 8.1% from 18 to 24, 30.2% from 25 to 44, 21.8% from 45 to 64, and 9.8% who were 65 years of age or older.  The median age was 33 years. For every 100 females, there were 96.9 males.  For every 100 females age 18 and over, there were 92.1 males.

Economically one of the poorer regions of the Northwest Arkansas region, the median income for a household in the city was $31,356, and the median income for a family was $34,818. Males had a median income of $28,037 versus $20,091 for females. The per capita income for the city was $14,976.  About 34.6% of families and 25.8% of the population were below the poverty line, including 28.3% of those under age 18 and 19.7% of those age 65 or over.

Parks and recreation
The West Fork of the White River flows through the east side of the town. The town sits on the West Fork of the White River, hence the name. Alongside the river is Riverside Park, a common spot for recreational activities such as parties and reunions. The park features playground equipment, several pavilions, many benches, and a walking path.

Education
West Fork Public Schools serves the city, and includes:
 West Fork Elementary
 West Fork Middle School
 West Fork High School

All of the West Fork schools are co-located on School Avenue, west of the White River. West Fork's official school mascot is a tiger.

Media
West Fork is the home of the Washington County Observer newspaper.

Notable people
Mildred Earp, professional women's baseball player

See also 
 Mineral Springs Community Building

References

External links
 The City of West Fork, Arkansas Portal style website, Government, Business, Library, Recreation and more
 Local.Arkansas.gov

Cities in Arkansas
Cities in Washington County, Arkansas
Northwest Arkansas
1885 establishments in Arkansas